Daphnephila ornithocephala is a species of gall midge first associated with leaf galls on Lauraceae species, particularly Machilus thunbergii in Taiwan. Based on analysis on sequences of the mitochondrial cytochrome c oxidase subunit I, it has been suggested that in this genus, the stem-galling habit is a more ancestral state as opposed to the leaf-galling habit. This genus appears to have originated tropically and dispersed to Japan through Taiwan.

References

Further reading 
 
 Chiang, Tung-Chyuan, and 江東權. "Biosystematics of the galling midge Daphnephila (Diptera: Cecidomyiidae) on Machilus spp.(Lauraceae) in Taiwan." (2012).

External links 

ADW

Diptera of Asia
Cecidomyiinae